The 1960–61 New York Rangers season was the franchise's 35th season. The Rangers finished in fifth place in the regular season with 54 points, and did not qualify for the NHL playoffs.

Regular season

Final standings

Record vs. opponents

Schedule and results

|- align="center" bgcolor="#CCFFCC"
| 1 || 5 || Boston Bruins || 2–1 || 1–0–0
|- align="center" bgcolor="#CCFFCC"
| 2 || 8 || @ Toronto Maple Leafs || 5–2 || 2–0–0
|- align="center" bgcolor="#FFBBBB"
| 3 || 9 || @ Chicago Black Hawks || 3–2 || 2–1–0
|- align="center" bgcolor="#FFBBBB"
| 4 || 11 || Montreal Canadiens || 3–2 || 2–2–0
|- align="center" bgcolor="#FFBBBB"
| 5 || 15 || @ Montreal Canadiens || 8–4 || 2–3–0
|- align="center" bgcolor="#FFBBBB"
| 6 || 16 || Toronto Maple Leafs || 7–2 || 2–4–0
|- align="center" bgcolor="#CCFFCC"
| 7 || 19 || Chicago Black Hawks || 2–0 || 3–4–0
|- align="center" bgcolor="#FFBBBB"
| 8 || 23 || Montreal Canadiens || 4–2 || 3–5–0
|- align="center" bgcolor="#CCFFCC"
| 9 || 26 || Detroit Red Wings || 4–3 || 4–5–0
|- align="center" bgcolor="#FFBBBB"
| 10 || 27 || @ Boston Bruins || 6–4 || 4–6–0
|- align="center" bgcolor="#FFBBBB"
| 11 || 30 || Toronto Maple Leafs || 3–1 || 4–7–0
|-

|- align="center" bgcolor="white"
| 12 || 2 || @ Chicago Black Hawks || 4–4 || 4–7–1
|- align="center" bgcolor="#FFBBBB"
| 13 || 5 || @ Toronto Maple Leafs || 7–3 || 4–8–1
|- align="center" bgcolor="#FFBBBB"
| 14 || 6 || @ Detroit Red Wings || 5–2 || 4–9–1
|- align="center" bgcolor="#FFBBBB"
| 15 || 9 || Detroit Red Wings || 4–3 || 4–10–1
|- align="center" bgcolor="#FFBBBB"
| 16 || 10 || @ Montreal Canadiens || 9–7 || 4–11–1
|- align="center" bgcolor="#FFBBBB"
| 17 || 13 || Montreal Canadiens || 2–1 || 4–12–1
|- align="center" bgcolor="#CCFFCC"
| 18 || 16 || Boston Bruins || 4–3 || 5–12–1
|- align="center" bgcolor="#FFBBBB"
| 19 || 20 || Detroit Red Wings || 4–3 || 5–13–1
|- align="center" bgcolor="#CCFFCC"
| 20 || 23 || Boston Bruins || 6–3 || 6–13–1
|- align="center" bgcolor="#CCFFCC"
| 21 || 24 || @ Boston Bruins || 5–3 || 7–13–1
|- align="center" bgcolor="white"
| 22 || 27 || Chicago Black Hawks || 3–3 || 7–13–2
|-

|- align="center" bgcolor="#FFBBBB"
| 23 || 3 || @ Toronto Maple Leafs || 5–2 || 7–14–2
|- align="center" bgcolor="#CCFFCC"
| 24 || 4 || @ Detroit Red Wings || 4–1 || 8–14–2
|- align="center" bgcolor="#FFBBBB"
| 25 || 7 || Detroit Red Wings || 3–1 || 8–15–2
|- align="center" bgcolor="#CCFFCC"
| 26 || 10 || @ Boston Bruins || 3–0 || 9–15–2
|- align="center" bgcolor="white"
| 27 || 11 || Boston Bruins || 2–2 || 9–15–3
|- align="center" bgcolor="#FFBBBB"
| 28 || 14 || @ Chicago Black Hawks || 4–0 || 9–16–3
|- align="center" bgcolor="white"
| 29 || 15 || @ Detroit Red Wings || 1–1 || 9–16–4
|- align="center" bgcolor="#FFBBBB"
| 30 || 17 || @ Montreal Canadiens || 2–0 || 9–17–4
|- align="center" bgcolor="#FFBBBB"
| 31 || 18 || Toronto Maple Leafs || 3–2 || 9–18–4
|- align="center" bgcolor="white"
| 32 || 21 || Chicago Black Hawks || 2–2 || 9–18–5
|- align="center" bgcolor="#CCFFCC"
| 33 || 25 || Montreal Canadiens || 4–1 || 10–18–5
|- align="center" bgcolor="#FFBBBB"
| 34 || 28 || Detroit Red Wings || 4–3 || 10–19–5
|- align="center" bgcolor="#FFBBBB"
| 35 || 31 || @ Toronto Maple Leafs || 2–1 || 10–20–5
|-

|- align="center" bgcolor="#FFBBBB"
| 36 || 1 || Toronto Maple Leafs || 4–1 || 10–21–5
|- align="center" bgcolor="#FFBBBB"
| 37 || 4 || Chicago Black Hawks || 3–2 || 10–22–5
|- align="center" bgcolor="#FFBBBB"
| 38 || 7 || @ Montreal Canadiens || 6–3 || 10–23–5
|- align="center" bgcolor="#CCFFCC"
| 39 || 8 || Montreal Canadiens || 4–2 || 11–23–5
|- align="center" bgcolor="white"
| 40 || 12 || @ Boston Bruins || 4–4 || 11–23–6
|- align="center" bgcolor="white"
| 41 || 14 || @ Detroit Red Wings || 2–2 || 11–23–7
|- align="center" bgcolor="#CCFFCC"
| 42 || 15 || @ Chicago Black Hawks || 3–1 || 12–23–7
|- align="center" bgcolor="white"
| 43 || 18 || @ Toronto Maple Leafs || 4–4 || 12–23–8
|- align="center" bgcolor="#FFBBBB"
| 44 || 21 || @ Chicago Black Hawks || 5–3 || 12–24–8
|- align="center" bgcolor="#CCFFCC"
| 45 || 22 || @ Detroit Red Wings || 5–3 || 13–24–8
|- align="center" bgcolor="#CCFFCC"
| 46 || 25 || Boston Bruins || 2–1 || 14–24–8
|- align="center" bgcolor="#FFBBBB"
| 47 || 29 || Toronto Maple Leafs || 4–1 || 14–25–8
|-

|- align="center" bgcolor="#CCFFCC"
| 48 || 1 || Chicago Black Hawks || 3–1 || 15–25–8
|- align="center" bgcolor="#FFBBBB"
| 49 || 2 || @ Montreal Canadiens || 7–5 || 15–26–8
|- align="center" bgcolor="#CCFFCC"
| 50 || 4 || @ Boston Bruins || 2–1 || 16–26–8
|- align="center" bgcolor="#CCFFCC"
| 51 || 5 || Boston Bruins || 5–2 || 17–26–8
|- align="center" bgcolor="#FFBBBB"
| 52 || 8 || @ Toronto Maple Leafs || 5–3 || 17–27–8
|- align="center" bgcolor="#FFBBBB"
| 53 || 9 || @ Detroit Red Wings || 4–2 || 17–28–8
|- align="center" bgcolor="white"
| 54 || 11 || Montreal Canadiens || 3–3 || 17–28–9
|- align="center" bgcolor="#FFBBBB"
| 55 || 12 || @ Boston Bruins || 8–3 || 17–29–9
|- align="center" bgcolor="#FFBBBB"
| 56 || 15 || @ Chicago Black Hawks || 5–2 || 17–30–9
|- align="center" bgcolor="#FFBBBB"
| 57 || 18 || @ Montreal Canadiens || 7–4 || 17–31–9
|- align="center" bgcolor="#CCFFCC"
| 58 || 19 || Toronto Maple Leafs || 4–2 || 18–31–9
|- align="center" bgcolor="#CCFFCC"
| 59 || 22 || Chicago Black Hawks || 4–2 || 19–31–9
|- align="center" bgcolor="#FFBBBB"
| 60 || 26 || Montreal Canadiens || 3–1 || 19–32–9
|-

|- align="center" bgcolor="#CCFFCC"
| 61 || 1 || Boston Bruins || 3–1 || 20–32–9
|- align="center" bgcolor="#FFBBBB"
| 62 || 2 || @ Chicago Black Hawks || 7–1 || 20–33–9
|- align="center" bgcolor="#FFBBBB"
| 63 || 4 || @ Toronto Maple Leafs || 5–4 || 20–34–9
|- align="center" bgcolor="#CCFFCC"
| 64 || 5 || Detroit Red Wings || 8–3 || 21–34–9
|- align="center" bgcolor="#FFBBBB"
| 65 || 8 || Chicago Black Hawks || 4–3 || 21–35–9
|- align="center" bgcolor="#FFBBBB"
| 66 || 9 || @ Montreal Canadiens || 6–1 || 21–36–9
|- align="center" bgcolor="#CCFFCC"
| 67 || 12 || Detroit Red Wings || 7–3 || 22–36–9
|- align="center" bgcolor="#FFBBBB"
| 68 || 14 || @ Detroit Red Wings || 5–2 || 22–37–9
|- align="center" bgcolor="#FFBBBB"
| 69 || 15 || @ Boston Bruins || 6–2 || 22–38–9
|- align="center" bgcolor="white"
| 70 || 19 || Toronto Maple Leafs || 2–2 || 22–38–10
|-

Playoffs
The Rangers failed to qualify for the 1961 Stanley Cup playoffs.

Player statistics
Skaters

Goaltenders

†Denotes player spent time with another team before joining Rangers. Stats reflect time with Rangers only.
‡Traded mid-season. Stats reflect time with Rangers only.

Awards and records

Transactions

See also
1960–61 NHL season

References

New York Rangers seasons
New York Rangers
New York Rangers
New York Rangers
New York Rangers
Madison Square Garden
1960s in Manhattan